Arthur Brady was a Scottish professional footballer who played as a defender for Burnley during the 1890s.

References

Year of birth unknown
Year of death missing
Association football midfielders
Burnley F.C. players
English Football League players
Scottish footballers